The Ground Zero Indicator, known by the acronym GZI was a specially designed shadowgraph instrument used by the British Royal Observer Corps during the Cold War to locate the Ground Zero of any nuclear explosion.

Overview
The GZI consisted of four horizontally mounted cardinal compass point pinhole cameras within a white enamelled metal drum, each 'camera' contained a sheet of photosensitive paper mounted within a clear plastic cassette on which were printed horizontal and vertical calibration lines delineating compass bearing and elevation above the horizon. The bright flash from a nuclear explosion would burn a mark on one or two of the papers within the drum. The position of the burn spot enabled the bearing and height of the burst to be estimated. With triangulation between neighbouring posts these readings would give an accurate height and position. 

The altitude of the explosion was important because a ground or near ground burst would produce radioactive fallout, whereas an air burst would produce only short distance and short lived initial radiations (but no fallout). Once combined with the peak-overpressure readings from post Bomb Power Indicator readings the power of the burst in megatons could also be calculated by the Triangulation Team in the group control building, using a hand held plastic calculator device.

Operations
Normally stored below ground the drum was mounted at the start of exercises or at Transition To War on a special above ground mount set in the concrete of the entrance hatch. Concentric lugs on the mount ensured that the drum was mounted correctly even in the dark.

The light sensitive photographic paper was unfixed chemically and had to be protected from daylight by being carried in a protective pouch strapped to the observer's chest. The cassettes were always lodged in a specific order so they could be changed in the pitch black with practice. Differing notched cutouts at the bottom of the cassettes ensured they could not be mounted at the incorrect cardinal point.

Daylight inevitably darkened the unfixed papers so routine changes were made at mid day during winter operations and twice daily, at mid day and sunset, during summer months. The sun burned a distinctive suntrail across the papers when there was no cloud cover.

Sixty seconds after any reading on the Bomb Power Indicator an observer exited the post and changed the GZI cassettes. The exposed papers were returned underground for assessment. The pre-exposed papers had a graticule grid exposed on the papers that showed degrees of bearing. The fireball from any nuclear burst within range would have burned a mark on the paper. The spot size and bearing would be reported to the group control together with an indication that the spot is touching or clear of the horizon, essential for indicating an air or ground burst.

Codeword
Reports following readings on the GZI were prefixed with the words "Nuclear Burst" and the monitoring post's operational identifier e.g. "Nuclear Burst Shrewsbury 56 post - (time) oh six hundred - Bearing zero seven zero - spotsize zero six - touching".

Training
For realistic exercise training photographic papers with simulated burst spots were prepared by the Exercise Division of the United Kingdom Warning and Monitoring Organisation at Cowley. Delivered sealed, the time of opening was written on the outside of the sealed envelope.

Observers trained blindfolded so that they could exit the post up the vertical steel ladder and complete a GZI cassette change quickly and even in the pitch dark of a winter's night.

References

See also
Royal Observer Corps
Operational instruments of the Royal Observer Corps

Royal Observer Corps
Cold War military equipment of the United Kingdom